Purity Mountain is a  summit in British Columbia, Canada.

Description

Purity Mountain is located along the southern boundary of Glacier National Park, and is the westernmost peak of the compact Purity Range, a subrange of the Selkirk Mountains. Purity is an attractive peak surrounded on three sides by névés, with no less than six glaciers radiating from it. On every side there is a wilderness of snow and ice above the rich green forests of the valleys. Precipitation runoff from the mountain drains north into Van Horne Brook, and southeast into Battle Brook which are both tributaries of the Incomappleux River. Purity Mountain is more notable for its steep rise above local terrain than for its absolute elevation.

History

The mountain was named in August 1890 by Harold Ward Topham of the Alpine Club of England who saw it from Donkin Pass. The mountain's toponym was officially adopted on May 29, 1901, by the Geographical Names Board of Canada.
 
The first ascent of the summit was made in 1890 by Harold Ward Topham, Emil Huber, and Henry Forster.

Climate

Based on the Köppen climate classification, Purity Mountain is located in a subarctic climate zone with cold, snowy winters, and mild summers. Winter temperatures can drop below −20 °C with wind chill factors below −30 °C. This climate supports the Van Horne Névé on the south slope, Odin Glacier on the east slope, and Purity Glacier to the north of the peak.

See also
Geography of British Columbia

References

External links
 Glacier National Park: Parks Canada
 Purity Mountain: Weather

Three-thousanders of British Columbia
Selkirk Mountains
Kootenay Land District
Glacier National Park (Canada)